Bolden Reush Harrison (April 26, 1886 – January 26, 1952) was a United States Navy seaman received the Medal of Honor for actions during the Moro Uprising. 

He is buried in Savannah Cemetery Savannah, Tennessee.

Medal of Honor citation
Rank and organization: Seaman, U.S. Navy. Born: April 26, 1886, Savannah, Tenn. Accredited to: Tennessee. G.O. No.: 138, December 13, 1911.

Citation:

While attached to the U.S.S. Pampang, Harrison was one of a shore party moving in to capture Mundang, on the island of Basilan, Philippine Islands, on September 24, 1911. Harrison instantly responded to the calls for help when the advance scout party investigating a group of nipa huts close to the trail, was suddenly taken under point-blank fire and rushed by approximately 20 enemy Moros attacking from inside the huts and from other concealed positions. Armed with a double-barreled shotgun, he concentrated his blasting fire on the outlaws, destroying 3 of the Moros and assisting in the rout of the remainder. By his aggressive charging of the enemy under heavy fire and in the face of great odds, Harrison contributed materially to the success of the engagement.

See also
List of Medal of Honor recipients

Notes

References

1886 births
1952 deaths
People from Savannah, Tennessee
American military personnel of the Philippine–American War
United States Navy Medal of Honor recipients
United States Navy sailors
Philippine–American War recipients of the Medal of Honor